International Jewish Day is an international day observed annually on August 2. It is a day of global celebration of the Jewish people and culture.

On this day, Swiss Catholics also celebrate "Dies Iudaicus" (Jewish Day). The bishop of Chur, Switzerland has noted particularly that Catholics should combat anti-Semitism, and promote peace and conciliation.

Sources
 https://web.archive.org/web/20110726130841/http://www.tachles.ch/news/gespraech-mit-den-aelteren-bruedern
 http://www.kath.ch/sbk-ces-cvs/text_detail.php?nemeid=127640&sprache=i
 https://web.archive.org/web/20120307124644/http://www.oecumene.radiovaticana.org/in2/articolo.asp?c=469496
 https://web.archive.org/web/20110930063059/http://www.radiovaticana.org/ung/articolo.asp?c=470763

Christian and Jewish interfaith dialogue